Athletes in Action (AIA) is an American sports organization founded in 1966. It is the sports ministry of Cru Ministries, formerly known as Campus Crusade for Christ.

History 
Athletes in Action was started in 1966 by Dave Hannah.

Participation in international tournaments
The core of the United States national basketball team that participated at the 1978 FIBA World Championship was composed by players from Athletes in Action. Athletes in Action has also participated at the William Jones Cup, an international basketball tournament held in Taiwan which featured both national teams and club sides. The Eastern Unit of the AIA won the 1977 edition besting second placers, the Eastern Washington Eagles and third placers Flying Camel of Taiwan. AIA also won the 2006 edition with the Chinese Taipei and Qatar national basketball teams finishing second and third respectively.

References

External links
 Athletes in Action website
 The Assist Athletes in Action
 Fact Sheet: Sports (Athletes in Action)

Evangelical parachurch organizations
Christian sports organizations
Basketball teams in the United States
1966 establishments in Ohio